Roza Kostandyan (born 20 May 2000), known professionally as Rosa Linn, is an Armenian singer-songwriter. She started her career by getting signed by Nvak Collective and releasing her debut single "King" with Kiiara in 2021. In 2022, Linn  in the Eurovision Song Contest 2022 in Turin, Italy with the song "Snap" and finished in 20th place. Following the contest, the song went viral on TikTok and charted globally; earning her a recording contract with Columbia Records.

Life and career

2000–2021: Early life and career beginnings
Kostandyan was born in Vanadzor, Northern Armenia. She began playing the piano at the age of six and at the ages of 11 to 12 started songwriting. Kostandyan is also highly involved with writing and producing her own music. In 2013, she participated in the Armenian national selection for the Junior Eurovision Song Contest with the song "". As a teenager in 2018, she lived in the United States for a year as an exchange student with the US Government funded Future Leaders Exchange Program (FLEX), residing in the state of Wisconsin.

Rosa Linn started her professional musical career after signing a recording contract with US-based record label Nvak Collective, founded by Alex Salibian and Tamar Kaprelian. In September 2021, Rosa Linn released her debut single "King" in collaboration with American singer Kiiara. She made her television debut performance of the song during the morning show on Public Television Company of Armenia (AMPTV) in November 2021.

2022–present: Eurovision Song Contest

In February 2022, Rosa Linn was rumoured to represent  in the Eurovision Song Contest 2022 in Turin, Italy. On 11 March, she was announced as the Armenian representative by AMPTV. Her Eurovision entry, titled "Snap", was released on 19 March alongside its music video. The song was written by Rosa Linn along with Tamar Kaprelian, Larzz Principato, Jeremy Dusoulet, Allie Crystal, and Courtney Harrell. Rosa Linn performed "Snap" on 10 May during the first semi-final of the contest, and qualified for the final. She performed the song once again in the final on 14 May and placed 20th.

Following the contest, "Snap" went viral on TikTok and entered numerous countries' national charts; reaching the top of the charts in the Flanders region of Belgium and the top ten in Austria, Netherlands, Ireland, Norway, Sweden and Switzerland. In August 2022, she signed a recording contract with Columbia Records. In October 2022, Linn was confirmed to be an opening act for Ed Sheeran on the North American leg of his +–=÷x Tour between June and July 2023. In the same month, she released a new music video for "Snap", filmed in the United States; and a collaborative single titled "WDIA (Would Do It Again)" with Dutch singer Duncan Laurence. On 31 October, she made her US television debut on The Late Late Show with James Corden, where she performed "Snap" with arrangement by musicians using Armenian traditional instruments. Linn performed "Snap" as an interval act for the Junior Eurovision Song Contest 2022, which took place on 11 December in Yerevan. She also wrote the common song for the contest, "Spin the Magic", performed by Maléna.

Discography

Singles

Awards and nominations

References

External links 
 Rosa Linn at AllMusic
 
 

Living people
21st-century Armenian women singers
Eurovision Song Contest entrants for Armenia
Eurovision Song Contest entrants of 2022
2000 births
People from Vanadzor